Tony the Landshark is the mascot of the Ole Miss Rebels, the collegiate athletic teams of the University of Mississippi. The anthropomorphic shark replaced Rebel Black Bear as the official mascot in 2018. On October 6, 2017, former Chancellor Jeffrey Vitter announced that the new university mascot would be the Landshark, beginning with the 2018–19 season.

History of the landshark at Ole Miss
The landshark symbol first made an appearance during the 2008 football season. The hand sign was created by Tony Fein. Fein, a native of Port Orchard, Washington, was an Army veteran who served a one-year tour in the Iraq War before arriving in Oxford. In 2009, Fein died from a drug overdose. The landshark symbol became less prominent as Fein departed from the football field, however it reemerged during the 2014 football season, when the Rebels possessed the best defense in the nation. However, the symbol has not been limited to just the football field. During the 2012–13 men's basketball season, the Rebels won the 2013 SEC men's basketball tournament and advanced to the NCAA tournament for the first time since 2002. The run was largely ignited by Marshall Henderson, who was known for his fiery landshark celebrations after a big shot. The landshark symbol was also significant during the 2017 softball season. In 2017, The Ole Miss Rebels softball team won the first SEC softball tournament in school history, hosted a Regional for the first time in school history, and advanced to Super Regionals for the first time in school history. The run was ignited by Mississippian pitcher, Kaitlin Lee, who pitched every single pitch of postseason play for the Rebels. After each of Lee's strikeouts, she displayed the landshark symbol. The symbol is still used today among all sports around the University. The new unofficial football sideline mascot of The University of Mississippi is head coach Lane Kiffin's dog, Juice.

References

Southeastern Conference mascots
Ole Miss Rebels
Fish mascots
Fictional sharks